The 1962 Army Cadets football team represented the United States Military Academy in the 1962 NCAA University Division football season. In their first year under head coach Paul Dietzel, the Cadets compiled a 6–4 record and outscored all opponents by a combined total of 152 to 104.  In the annual Army–Navy Game, the Cadets lost to the Midshipmen by a 34 to 14 score. The Cadets also lost to Michigan, Oklahoma State, and Pittsburgh. 
 
No Army players were selected on the 1962 College Football All-America Team.

Schedule

References

Army
Army Black Knights football seasons
Army Cadets football